Yedakadu (also known as Edakadu) is a serene hamlet located in the Nilgiris Hills in the state of Tamil Nadu in South India. Yedakadu is located 26 km from Udhagamandalam (Ooty) and 38 km from Coonoor. The major occupation of the people is tea plantation. Yedakadu is popular for its 'Sivarathiri' (Lord Shiva Festival), an annual carnival which draws a large crowd from around the Nilgiris. Badaga is the native language. There are three places within the village named "Naduhatty","Sundatty" & "Thalaihatty". 

Villages in Nilgiris district